County Road 171 is a  county road that runs between Gran in Sørum and Finstadbråten, Aursmoen in Aurskog-Høland, Norway.

External links 
 NAFs Vegbok: Frogner – Bjørkelangen – Hemnes vegrute R171 – R170 – R115: Fra E6 rett øst, over Glomma, gjennom Sørumsand mot de dype skoger ved svenskegrensen.

171
Sørum
Aurskog-Høland
Former Norwegian national roads